Samuel Belcher (1 November 1834 – 22 August 1920) was an Australian cricketer. He played one first-class match for New South Wales in 1866/67.

See also
 List of New South Wales representative cricketers

References

External links
 

1834 births
1920 deaths
Australian cricketers
New South Wales cricketers
Cricketers from Sheffield
British emigrants to Australia